Forever Young is Kaysha's album released 2009.

Track list

 Anti Bad Music Police
 Be With You
 Digital Sexyness
 Duro
 Fanta & Avocado
 Forever Young Intro
 Funky Makaku
 Glorious Beautiful
 Heaven
 Hey Girl
 I Give You the Music
 I Still Love You
 Joachim
 Kota Na Piste
 Les Belles Histoires D'amour
 Love You Need You
 Loving and Kissing
 Make More Dollars
 Nobody Else
 On Veut Juste Danser
 Once Again
 Outro
 Paradisio / Inferno
 Pour Toujours
 Pure
 Si Tu T'en Vas
 Simple Pleasures
 Tell Me What We Waiting For
 That African Shit
 The Sweetest Thing
 The Way You Move
 Toi Et Moi
 U My Bb
 Yes You Can
 You + Me
 You're My Baby Girl

2009 albums